Crataegus macrosperma, the bigfruit hawthorn is a species of hawthorn native to most of the eastern United States and adjacent Canada, though uncommon at lower altitudes in the south. It is sometimes misidentified as C. flabellata. It is one of the earliest hawthorns to bloom in spring.

References

macrosperma
Trees of the Southeastern United States
Flora of North America